Silver Zone is an extinct town in Elko County, in the U.S. state of Nevada.  The GNIS classifies it as a populated place. The town was located at the mountain pass where the Feather River Route (today known as the Shafter Subdivision) and Interstate 80 cross the Toano Range.

History
Silver Zone had its start in 1872 as a mining community. A variant name was "Silverzone". A post office operated at Silver Zone from 1872 until 1873.  By 1941, Silver Zone had ten inhabitants.

References

Ghost towns in Elko County, Nevada